Neocrepidodera nigritula is a species of flea beetle from Chrysomelidae family that can be found everywhere in Europe except for Albania, Andorra, Benelux, Denmark, Liechtenstein, Moldova, Monaco, North Macedonia, Portugal, San Marino, Spain, Vatican City, Yugoslavia, and various European islands.

References

Beetles described in 1813
Beetles of Europe
nigritula